Regionuli Liga (Georgian: რეგიონული ლიგა), run by Georgian Football Federation since 1990, is the fifth and lowest division of the Georgian league system after Erovnuli Liga, Erovnuli Liga 2, Liga 3 and Liga 4. Its participants are both professional clubs and reserve teams of higher league members.   

Prior to the introduction of Liga 4 in 2019, Regionuli Liga was the fifth tier.

Structure
As the name implies, the league is based on regional principle. Depending on the number of participating clubs, it is divided into several groups. In 2017, there were forty teams allocated in three groups. The next year two zones were created for teams based in Western Georgia and two more for the eastern regions. This regulation lasted three seasons until 2021, when the league was split into two groups. 

The number of promoted clubs per season also varies. Usually only the group winners gain automatic promotion, although several second-placed and third-placed teams, too, directly or through play-offs have advanced to the fourth tier in recent years. In another case, play-off ties against Liga 3 teams determined the fate of Liga 4 two slots.     

The seasons are played on Spring-Autumn system.

Current season
 
For the 2022 season 25 clubs from the southern and eastern parts of Georgia and three Tbilisi-based teams from Abkhazia formed A and B groups, while zone C consisted of eleven clubs from the western regions. At the end of the season four teams gained promotion to Liga 4. Three group winners were joined by one of the runners-up based on play-off results among the three second-placed teams. 

Clubs represented in Regionuli liga for the 2022 season are listed below in alphabetical order. Four of them have in the past participated in the top division: 
 Dinamo Sokhumi in 2005-06;
 Iveria Khashuri in 1990-97;
 Mertskhali Ozurgeti in 1990-92 and 2003-04;
 Tskhumi Sokhumi in 1990-93.
   

Notes: 

Dinamo Sokhumi, Liakhvi Achabeti, Kolkhi Gulripshi and Tskhumi Sokhumi are based in Tbilisi due to problems related to the territorial integrity of Georgia.

Past seasons

Group Winners

Promoted teams

Notes: Aragvi Dusheti and Samgurali Tskaltubo-2 beat their upper league rivals in the 2017 play-offs. So did Gareji Sagarejo a year later. All the other clubs were promoted directly. In 2018 and 2019, the second phase of competition was held in Promotion Groups. As a result, in comparison with the initial phase, the final table of these seasons sustained some changes.

References

5
Geo